Mynydd Ty-Isaf, Rhondda is a Site of Special Scientific Interest near Treherbert in Rhondda Cynon Taf, south Wales.

See also
List of Sites of Special Scientific Interest in Mid & South Glamorgan

Sites of Special Scientific Interest in Rhondda Cynon Taf